Bird's Eye View is the debut full-length album by singer-songwriter Amy Kuney, which was released August 12, 2008 by Spin Move Records. The iTunes version of the album includes a cover of Damien Rice's song, "The Blower's Daughter."

The album was featured on iTunes' "New Releases" and "Indie" music sections from August 12 through August 19. During the months of February and March 2009, "Bird's Eye View was featured on iTunes' "New and Noteworthy" section on the Singer/Songwriter page.

Bird's Eye View was featured on Rhapsody's homepage as a new release, and on WindowsMedia.com under "Emerging Artists."

Track listing
All songs written by Amy Kuney; "The Blower's Daughter" written by Damien Rice.
"Simple Things" – 4:14
"Rocket Surgery" – 3:59
"Angel Tangled In The Telephone Lines" – 3:20
"Would You Miss Me" – 3:44
"Thank You For Last Night" – 3:12
"Love Is Trippy" – 3:57
"Appreciate Your Hands" – 3:59
"Time Machine" – 2:57
"Under My Bed" – 5:53
"Bird's Eye View" – 3:48
"The Blower's Daughter" (iTunes bonus track)

Personnel
Drums - Scott Seiver
Bass - Shawn Davis, 
Piano - Amy Kuney, Scott Seiver, 
Guitars: Scott Seiver, Josh Lopez, Amy Kuney, Ari Hest
Violin - Marisa Kuney, Elizabeth Headman
Viola: Rodney Wirtz
Cello - Ira Glansbeek
Cajon - Mona Tavakoli
Saxophone - Ben Wendel
Tuba - Chuck Koontz
French Horn - Sarah Bach
Trombone - Clifford Childers
Trumpet - Dustin McKinney
Melodica - Scott Seiver
Wurlitzer - Scott Seiver
Mellotron - Scott Seiver
Synthesizer - Scott Seiver
Tambourine - Scott Seiver
Timpani - Scott Seiver
Shaker - Scott Seiver
Organ - Scott Seiver
String Arrangements - Scott Seiver
Horn Arrangement - Scott Seiver
Choir Arrangement - Scott Seiver
Orchestration - Ben Wendel
Backing Vocals - Scott Seiver, Ari Hest, Azusa Pacific University Choir, 
Horn Section Contracting - Ben Wendel
String Section Contracting - Marisa Kuney

Production
Produced by Scott Seiver
Mixed by Peter A. Barker and Scott Seiver
Engineered by Peter A. Barker (additional engineering by Scott Seiver)
Assistant Engineers: Scott Coslett, Todd Bergman, Ursula Arevalo
Mastered by Gil Tamazyan
Recording Studios: Threshold Sound + Vision and Loma Lada Studios
Executive Producers: Peter A. Barker, Marc Schrobilgen,

References

External links 
 Bird's Eye View AllMusic Page

2008 debut albums
Amy Kuney albums